White Deer Creek is a tributary of the West Branch Susquehanna River in Centre County and Union County, in Pennsylvania, in the United States. Parts of the creek are designated as impaired.

White Deer Creek is a freestone stream in mountainous terrain. The creek flows alongside Interstate 80 for much of its length. A significant part of the land in the creek's watershed is forested, with large areas being owned by the Pennsylvania Bureau of Forestry. The watershed of the creek is designated as a High-Quality Coldwater Fishery and a Migratory Fishery. It has both brook trout and brown trout and is stocked with trout.

White Deer Creek's name comes from the word Woap'-achtu-hanne, meaning "white-deer stream". The creek appeared on maps as early as 1759. A number of mills were constructed on it in the 18th and 19th centuries. Major historic industries in the watershed included lumbering and agriculture. A number of bridges have been constructed across the creek. Much of the length of White Deer Creek is in Bald Eagle State Forest; the creek also passes through McCalls Dam State Park. Other recreational opportunities include angling and canoeing.

Course

White Deer Creek begins in a valley to the north of Hall Mountain in Miles Township, Centre County, near the Centre County/Clinton County line. It flows east through its relatively deep, narrow valley for more than a mile before receiving its first named tributary, Tunis Run, from the right. The creek then meanders east-northeast through its valley for several miles, passing near several mountains, such as McCall Mountain, along the way. It eventually exits Miles Township and Centre County.

Upon exiting Centre County, White Deer Creek enters Hartley Township, Union County. It continues meandering east-northeast for several tenths of a mile before entering Lewis Township. In this township, the creek continues meandering east-northeast for a few miles, passing more mountains before entering West Buffalo Township. In this township, it flows east-northeast for more than a mile before turning northeast for several tenths of a mile and receiving the tributary Cowbell Hollow from the left. Shortly afterwards, the creek turns northwest for a few tenths of a mile before turning north-northeast and receiving its longest tributary, Sand Spring Run, from the left and passing Pine Flat. The creek then begins flowing east-northeast again, now fairly close to Interstate 80, and receives the tributary Mile Run from the left and passing Little Mountain. Several tenths of a mile further downstream, it enters White Deer Township. The creek heads east for several tenths of a mile before receiving Lick Run, its last named tributary, from the left.

White Deer Creek then turns northeast for several tenths of a mile before turning east. For the next several miles, the creek heads in a generally easterly direction between South White Deer Ridge and Catharines Crown/Nittany Mountain, still alongside Interstate 80. The creek's valley broadens and in leaves behind Catharines Crown; by this point there are no more mountains on its southern side. It turns northeast and then east-southeast before turning east-northeast and crossing Interstate 80.  The creek then flows east for a few miles, still following South White Deer Ridge. It then crosses US Route 15 and a few tenths of a mile later, reaches its confluence with the West Branch Susquehanna River.

Tributaries
White Deer Creek has five named tributaries: Lick Run, Mile Run, Sand Spring Run, Cowbell Hollow, and Tunis Run.

Hydrology
Some reaches of White Deer Creek are not designated as impaired waterbodies. However, several miles in the creek's watershed are impaired. In one reach, the creek is impaired by habitat alterations due to hydromodification; in the other impaired reach, it is impaired by mercury in the water column from an unknown source.

In 1975 and 1976, the turbidity of White Deer Creek near White Deer ranged from 1 to 2 Jackson Turbidity Units. The creek carries high levels of sediment.

The concentrations of recoverable nickel, copper, and cadmium were less than  most or all of the times they were measured.

Geography, geology, and climate

The valleys in the watershed of White Deer Creek are generally narrow. At some points, the valley walls rise steeply almost immediately from the creek's streambanks, which made the construction of roads through those areas difficult.

White Deer Creek is a freestone stream. There are numerous strainers on White Deer Creek, to the point where the creek was described as "one of the most tree-infested and strainer-struck streams in the state". The creek's channel is also braided in some reaches. The creek flows through a very narrow valley and, in its upper reaches, is small for a canoeing stream. The community of White Deer experiences significant flooding problems because it is on the creek's floodplain, and because of the creek's narrow valley. The topography of the watershed is mountainous, with the creek's narrow valley being surrounded by steep ridges. The watershed was described as rugged, with sharp topographical features, in a 1938 report.

Although there are several camps along White Deer Creek, the area in its vicinity is not heavily developed until the creek's final few miles. There are a number of long, rocky rapids on the creek near Nittany Mountain, and the whitewater on the creek only ends in its lowermost reaches. A  dam for water supply is located on White Deer Creek a few miles upstream of Interstate 80. The creek experiences erosion and instability at its mouth.

The channel of White Deer Creek is sinuous and flows through rock formations consisting of sandstone. The creek has a rocky streambed and high banks. The floodplain of the creek is one of the more prominent floodplains in Union County. There are numerous riffles on the creek where it flows past boulders.

In the lowlands of the White Deer Creek watershed, coarse-grained soils are predominant; sand, silt, gravel, and boulders are common. Clay occurs in a few areas near old dams. The sides of the valley are covered by sandstone and dolomite outcrops, and dolomite boulders, while the ridgetops are composed of weather-resistant sandstone.

The creek maintains cool temperatures even when other freestone streams become to warm or shallow to fish in. However, it does tend to become relatively shallow in the springtime. The creek remains clear except after major storms.

Watershed
The mouth of the creek is in the United States Geological Survey quadrangle of Milton. However, its source is in the quadrangle of Loganton. The creek also passes through the quadrangles of Williamsport SE and Carroll. It generally flows in an easterly direction. Its mouth is located within  of White Deer. The watershed is mostly situated in eastern Centre County and northern Union County. The creek is one of the major streams in Union County.

White Deer Creek flows alongside Interstate 80 in northern Union County for a substantial portion of its length, although the highway can rarely be seen or heard from the creek in most reaches.

The White Deer District of the Pennsylvania-American Water Company, which serves 41,000 people in 15 municipalities in Northumberland County and Union County, uses a small dam on White Deer Creek as one of its main water supplies. Upstream of this dam, more than 99 percent of the watershed of the creek is forested. The Pennsylvania Bureau of Forestry owns the vast majority of the land in the creek's watershed upstream of the dam. However, the Pennsylvania Bureau of State Parks owns two small tracts and the Pennsylvania-American Water Company owns the area around the dam. The remainder of the land in this part of the watershed is owned by the Pennsylvania Department of Transportation. However, there is land devoted to agriculture in the area between White Deer Creek, Interstate 80, and US Route 15.

An overhead power line, a compressed natural gas pipeline, on-lot wastewater systems, and unpaved roads are present in the watershed of White Deer Creek. These are considered by the Pennsylvania-American Water Company to be potential sources of contamination to its water supply on the creek. As of 1993, there is a 100-foot (30-meter) selective logging zone on both sides of the creek in state forest lands.

History
White Deer Creek was entered into the Geographic Names Information System on August 2, 1979. Its identifier in the Geographic Names Information System is 1191267. The creek is also known as Whitedeer Creek or South Branch White Deer Creek. These variant names appear in David B. Stevenson's 1969 master's thesis Place Names of Centre County Pennsylvania: A Geographical Analysis.

White Deer Creek's name comes from the Delaware word Woap'-achtu-hanne, meaning "white-deer 
stream". White Deer Creek appears on Scull's map in 1759 as Opaghtanoten and White Flint Creek.

The widow Catharine Smith began building a sawmill and a gristmill on White Deer Creek in 1774 and completed the construction in 1775. Smith established a boring mill at the mouth of White Deer Creek in the summer of 1776. The mill was used to make gun barrels for the Continental Army during the American Revolutionary War. An early settlement near the creek was destroyed by the British in 1777.

A state road running between Bellefonte and the mouth of White Deer Creek was constructed in 1824. Numerous mills had been constructed on the creek by the 1830s. These included Daniel Caldwell's stone gristmill, fulling mill, sawmill, carding machine, and distillery. In 1845, G.W. Green, Joseph Green, and David Howard established a pig iron furnace whose blast was powered by a race on the creek. John McCall, a native of Scotland, established a camp in the upper reaches of the watershed by 1860 and used splash dams to float the logs downstream to his mill. Ario Pardee later established a system to float them all the way to the mouth of White Deer Creek, where they were ferried to Watsontown for milling.

Near the turn of the 20th century, the Kulp Lumber Mill processed millions of board feet of timber taken from White Deer Creek and Spruce Run via a narrow gauge railway system. In the early 1900s, the main industry in the watershed of White Deer Creek was agriculture. Major communities in the watershed during this time period included Whitedeer, which had a population of 136. The White Deer and Loganton Railroad also followed the creek throughout its length. The tracks were removed in 1916. The Lewisburg and Tyrone Railroad also had spurs reaching into the upper reaches of the creek's watershed. White Deer Creek was used as a water supply by the White Deer Mountain Water Company during this time period, as well.

A two-span prestressed box beam or girders bridge carrying State Route 1003 over the creek was built in 1958 and repaired in 2011. One was repaired in 1994 and the other in 1999.

The White Deer Creek Restoration Committee, which was established to study instability problems for White Deer Creek and potential solutions, received a $5275 Growing Greener grant in 2000.

Biology
The drainage basin of White Deer Creek is designated as a High-Quality Coldwater Fishery and a Migratory Fishery. Stocking of the stream was done as early as the 1930s. Both native brook trout and brown trout inhabit the creek.

At least one rare species has been observed in the vicinity of White Deer Creek. In the early 1900s, the land phase of the red-spotted newt was sometimes observed at the White Deer Dam. Beavers have historically inhabited the creek's watershed in large numbers, causing pollution problems. Other mammal species that have existed in the watershed include deer, bears, wildcats, and porcupines, while birds included whippoorwills and wild turkeys. Rattlesnakes and copperheads were also observed in the watershed in the 1930s.

Forests and dense areas of mountain laurel occupy most of the valley of White Deer Creek in some reaches. The stream's forested valley consists mainly of hemlock trees and mixed oak forest. The Union County Natural Areas Inventory recommended maintaining a forested riparian buffer around the creek.

The original virgin timber in the watershed of White Deer Creek was cut down in the 1890s. However, occasional old-growth pines or oaks remained. As a 1938 report noted, rhododendrons and mountain laurel thickets also grew extremely densely in the watershed, through the vegetation became less dense at higher elevations, with only scrub oak forests on the ridgetops.

Recreation

The watershed of White Deer Creek has been a significant recreational area since at least the 1930s, by which time improved roads granted access to the watershed. This allowed wealthier residents of Lewisburg, Milton, Sunbury, Watsontown, and Williamsport to construct weekend/vacation cabins in the watershed. Hunting and fishing clubs were also active in the area by this time period.

At least  of White Deer Creek is navigable by canoe during rapid spring snowmelt or within five days of heavy rain. The difficulty of the creek ranges from 1 to 3- and the scenery is described as "good" in Edward Gertler's book Keystone Canoeing.

Much of the length of White Deer Creek is in state forest lands. The state park is surrounded by Bald Eagle State Forest, which the creek flows through from its headwaters downstream to its lower reaches.

The scenery in the vicinity of White Deer Creek has been described as "thick and beautiful". The creek is a viable destination for angling, although angling is difficult. However, it is not nationally known, possibly due to its small size and the fact that the Delayed Harvest Fly-Fishing Only reach is in remote a location. It is classified as Approved Trout Waters by the Pennsylvania Fish and Boat Commission from Cooper Mill Road downstream to the creek's mouth. The creek has been described as "an excellent dry fly stream".

The Mid State Trail also crosses the creek.

See also
Warrior Run (West Branch Susquehanna River), next tributary of the West Branch Susquehanna River going downstream
Spring Run (West Branch Susquehanna River), next tributary of the West Branch Susquehanna River going upstream
List of rivers of Pennsylvania

References

Rivers of Pennsylvania
Tributaries of the West Branch Susquehanna River
Rivers of Centre County, Pennsylvania
Rivers of Union County, Pennsylvania